Bouiche is a village in Bouïra Province, Algeria.

References

Populated places in Bouïra Province